A hat-trick in cricket is when a bowler takes three wickets on consecutive deliveries, dismissing three different batsmen. It is a relatively rare event in Women's Twenty20 International (WT20I) cricket with only 30 occurrences in over 1,000 matches.

The first Women's Twenty20 hat-trick was taken by Asmavia Iqbal of Pakistan, playing against England in Loughborough on 5 September 2012. This is also the only instance where the team lost the match despite a player taking a hat-trick. Concy Aweko is the only player who took more than one hat-trick in Women's T20I cricket.

Hat-tricks by national team

Key

Hat-tricks

See also 
 List of women's international cricket hat-tricks
 List of Twenty20 International cricket hat-tricks
 Women's Twenty20 International

References 

Women's cricket-related lists
Hattricks
Women's Twenty20